Parliamentary elections were held in Bulgaria on 24 December 1939, although voting continued in some areas into January 1940. The elections were officially held on a non-partisan basis with the Bulgarian Agrarian National Union and Bulgarian Communist Party banned, and in a process tightly controlled by Tsar Boris III, by then the real power in the country.  However, candidates representing parties did contest the elections. Pro-government candidates won a majority of seats. Voter turnout was 67.2%.

Results

References

Bulgaria
Parliamentary election
Parliamentary elections in Bulgaria
Non-partisan elections
Election and referendum articles with incomplete results
1939 elections in Bulgaria